Concerto Köln is an ensemble specialising in music of the eighteenth and nineteenth centuries.

The group formed in 1985, one of many groups associated with the surging interest in period instruments in that decade. Its members consisted mainly of recent graduates of conservatories from across Europe. They began touring the Continent, often making appearances at major festivals. In 1992 they founded the Cologne Festival of Early Music with the aid of Deutschland Radio. They receive no government subsidies, and do not have a permanent conductor, though the group has an artistic director, Martin Sandhoff. Among the concert masters is Evgeny Sviridov.

Their repertory stretches from early Baroque on through the Classical Era and as far into the nineteenth century as Wagner. They have also done a number of collaborative works, such as a disc juxtaposing Turkish folk music with pieces in a Turkish style by composers such as Mozart. They have recorded frequently with, among others, René Jacobs, Daniel Harding, Louis Langrée, David Stern, Ivor Bolton, Marcus Creed, Christopher Moulds and Evelino Pidò.

Discography 
The ensemble has released more than 50 recordings, including:
 1987: Antonio Vivaldi; Giovanni Battista Sammartini; Pietro Antonio Locatelli - Six Concerti Venetiens
 1987: Gluck - Echo et Narcisse (Harmonia Mundi France)
 1990: Bach - Auf schmetternde Töne, BWV 207a, Schleicht, spielende Wellen, BWV 206
 1991: Handel - Giulio Cesare
 1992: Francesco Durante - Concerti
 1994: Gaetano Brunetti - Sinfonien	
 1998: Carl Heinrich Graun - Cleopatra & Cesare
 1999: John Field - Piano Concertos Nos. 2 & 3, with Andreas Staier
 1999: Mozart - Così fan tutte
 2002: Uri Caine - Diabelli Variations (Winter & Winter)
 2003: Dream of the Orient. Concerto Köln & Ensemble Sarband (Echo Klassik)
 2004: Mozart - Le nozze di Figaro (Grammy Award)
 2005: The Waltz. Concerto Köln & Ensemble Sarband (Echo Klassik)
 2009: Henri-Joseph Rigel - Symphonies. (Echo Klassik)
 2010: Antonio Caldara - Arias with Philippe Jaroussky (Virgin Classics)
 2010: Bach - Orchestral Suites
 2012: Vinci - Artaserse

References
[ Info] at Allmusic

External links 
 
 

German orchestras
Instrumental early music groups
Musical groups established in 1985
Music in Cologne
Deutsche Grammophon artists
1985 establishments in West Germany